Douglas John Armstrong (born 22 May 1990) is a British online personality, YouTube content creator, and presenter who has reached over 400,000 followers across all his social media channels. Since late 2017, he mainly produces music videos, but is also known for creating content across other verticals including lifestyle, travel and entertainment. He resides in London, United Kingdom.

He was invited to Malawi, Africa to support the Sightsavers charity in 2015, where he presented a live stream of a man receiving a simple yet life-changing operation to remove his cataracts and restore his eyesight. In February 2015 he created a chocolate maze made entirely out of chocolate fingers with the help of a food artist and built to the model of the size in the film The Maze Runner to celebrate the film's DVD and Blu-ray release and help promote the film. Also known for his fun yet insightful interviews with celebrities, musicians & film stars, Armstrong has interviewed Bella Thorne for her role in the film The Duff, Liam Payne before his performance at the BBC Radio 1 Teen Awards in 2017, Hugh Jackman for the release of The Greatest Showman and most recently Nick Robinson and Katherine Langford for the release of the film Love, Simon. When not writing his own comedy/LGBT songs, Armstrong often collaborates with other successful musicians, including The Vamps; New Hope Club; Keala Settle, the original singer of “This Is Me”; and Rachel Tucker, the original lead in the West End production of Come from Away.

Personal life
He officially came out as gay in 2015 but told viewers in his video that coming out should not be a big deal. He dealt with his sexuality in his debut EP released in August 2018, It's Okay to Be Gay that contains four tracks: The title track "It's Okay to Be Gay", in addition, "I Really Want a Boyfriend", "I Wanna Wear a Crop Top" and "What I Like About Guys".

Charity and activism
Armstrong is known to support a few charities: He sung on a charity song released worldwide by The Vamps as part of an effort to raise money and awareness for the Teenage Cancer Trust. Since losing his father to cancer, he's had a key role in supporting Stand Up to Cancer's online campaigns; in 2016 he raised £1,942.57 for the charity by walking around London wearing only Stand Up to Cancer underwear for 6 hours, and in 2017 he was a key part of the Stand Up to Cancer 4-hour live-stream on YouTube. He has also featured in photoshoots for a number of Alzheimer's Research UK online campaigns.

Discography

EPs
2018: It's Okay to Be Gay

References

1992 births
Living people
People from East Sussex
Gay entertainers
British LGBT entertainers
20th-century English LGBT people
21st-century English LGBT people
LGBT YouTubers